The Alienist (also known as O Alienista) is a 1970 Brazilian comedy film directed by Nelson Pereira dos Santos.  The film was entered into the 1970 Cannes Film Festival.

Cast
 Nildo Parente as Father Simão Bacamarte
 Isabel Ribeiro as D. Evarista
 Arduíno Colassanti as Porfírio (as Arduino Colasanti)
 Irene Stefânia as Porfírio's lover (as Irene Stephania)
 Leila Diniz as Eudóxia
 Ana Maria Magalhães
 Nelson Dantas as The Accountant
 Ney Santanna as Imprisoned madman (uncredited)

Production
It was shot in the city of Paraty in the state of Rio de Janeiro.

References

External links

1970 comedy films
1970 films
Brazilian comedy films
Films based on Brazilian novels
Films directed by Nelson Pereira dos Santos
Films shot in Paraty
1970s Portuguese-language films